California King may refer to:

 California King (bed), a particular size of bed
 "California King Bed", a song on Rihanna's 2010 album Loud
 California kingsnake, a nonvenomous snake commonly kept as a pet.
 "California King", a song by Sykamore from the 2022 album Pinto

See also 
 King of California, a 2007 film starring Michael Douglas and Evan Rachel Wood
 King of California (album), a 1994 album by Dave Alvin